The 2015–16 season of the Guadeloupe Division d'Honneur is the 65th season of top-tier football in Guadeloupe. It started on 4 September 2015 and finished on 24 May 2016. CS Moulien were the defending champions, having won their 11th top tier title last season.  USR won their first title this season.

Changes from 2014–15 

At the end of last season, AS Gosier and Racing Club finished in 13th and 14th place in the league and were relegated to the Promotion d'Honneur Régionale. Taking their places were the winners and runners up from the Promotion d'Honneur Régionale, Amical Club and Gourbeyrienne.

Teams

Table

Results

External links 
 Guadeloupe Division of Honor on RSSSF
 Guadeloupe Division of Honor on Soccerway

2015–16 in Caribbean football leagues
2015 in Guadeloupe
2016 in Guadeloupe
2015-16